Amaël Moinard (born 2 February 1982 in Cherbourg) is a French former professional road bicycle racer, who competed professionally between 2005 and 2019 for the ,  and  teams.

Moinard announced at the end of Tour de France that he would retire at the end of the 2019 season.

Major results

2006
 6th Châteauroux Classic de l'Indre
 8th Overall Tour de l'Avenir
 8th Overall Tour du Poitou-Charentes
2007
 10th Overall Route du Sud
1st Stage 3
2008
 9th Overall Tour Méditerranéen
 10th Grand Prix de Plumelec-Morbihan
  Combativity award Stage 11 Tour de France
2010
 Paris–Nice
1st  Mountains classification
1st Stage 7
 7th Overall La Tropicale Amissa Bongo
 7th Duo Normand (with Julien Fouchard)
2014
 3rd Overall Tour du Haut Var
1st Stage 2
 9th Overall Arctic Race of Norway
2015
 1st Stage 1 (TTT) Vuelta a España
 7th Volta Limburg Classic
2016
 6th Classic Sud-Ardèche
 10th Overall Arctic Race of Norway

Grand Tour general classification results timeline

References

External links

 

French male cyclists
1982 births
Living people
People from Cherbourg-Octeville
Sportspeople from Manche
Cyclists from Normandy